The Salvation Blues is a 2007 solo album by singer/songwriter Mark Olson.

Olson's 10-year marriage to Victoria Williams had ended in divorce and he subsequently suffered from depression. He wrote the songs for the album while recovering in Cardiff, Wales. He recorded demos in Wales, Norway, Poland and Minnesota as well. Olson and the making of the album were the subject of a half-hour documentary, The Salvation Blues, released by Grain Pictures.

Reception

Writing for Allmusic, music critic Thom Jurek praised the Olson's songwriting and wrote "Ultimately, it comes down to the songs, though. And Mark Olson has them here in spades. with the presentation being so utterly simple, a lot of weight rests not only on the singer, but on the lyrics and melody. And Olson delivers, though the often shining optimism of his offerings has been tempered in places by grief, loss, and the workaday living of everyday life that blends dream and reality as time rushes forward; still he champions humble human nobility in choosing life over death each and every morning... Salvation Blues is stripped down, modern desert country music at its very best."

Track listing
All songs by Mark Olson unless otherwise noted.

"My Carol"
"Clifton Bridge"
"Poor Michael's Boat" (Olson, Louris)
"National Express" (Olson, Williams, Russell)
"Salvation Blues"
"Keith"
"Winter Song" (Olson, Williams)
"Sandy Denny"
"Tears From Above"
"Look Into the Night"
"My One Book Philosophy"

European Bonus Tracks
"Copper Coin"
"Your Time Will Come"

Personnel 
 Mark Olson – vocals, acoustic guitar, Wurlitzer on "My One Book Philosophy"
 Tony Gilkyson – electric guitar
 Greg Leisz – pedal steel, dobro, mandolin
 Zac Rae – piano, organ, Wurlitzer, vibes, Chamberlain, Mellotron
 David J. Carpenter – bass
 Danny Fankel – percussion, bongos
 Michele Gazich – violin
 Kevin Jarvis – drums
 Ingunn Ringvold – acoustic guitar
 Cindy Wasserman – harmony vocals
 Gary Louris – harmony vocals

Production notes
 Pete Lyman – engineer
 Kevin Jarvis – engineer
 Alfonso Rodenas – engineer
 Ben Vaughn – producer
 Joe Gastwist – mastering

References

2007 albums
Mark Olson (musician) albums